County cricket teams representing Middlesex have been traced back to the 18th century, although for long periods the county was secondary to the London Cricket Club which played at the Artillery Ground. Middlesex teams played at various grounds throughout what is now the Greater London area. Islington and Uxbridge were often used but home matches were also played on Kennington Common and in Berkshire. Middlesex teams were less frequent in the 19th century until 1859 when the Walker family of Southgate became involved in county cricket.

Until 1863, teams were formed ad hoc by various patrons and clubs, often on an informal basis. Depending on the strength of the opposition, teams called Middlesex have generally been recognised as top-class. Middlesex County Cricket Club was founded in December 1863 and its team has been recognised as the county's representative in first-class cricket from the 1864 season.

17th century
As elsewhere in south east England, cricket became established in Middlesex during the 17th century and the earliest village matches took place before the English Civil War. The first definite mention of cricket in London or Middlesex dates from 1680.

18th century

Venues
The earliest known match in Middlesex took place at Lamb's Conduit Field in Holborn on 3 July 1707 involving teams from London and Croydon. In 1718, the first reference is found to White Conduit Fields in Islington, which later became a famous London venue. The earliest reference to a team called Middlesex is on 5 August 1729 in a match against London Cricket Club "in the fields behind the Woolpack, in Islington, near Sadlers Wells, for £50 a side".

1731 controversy
There was a much-publicised controversial incident on Monday, 23 August 1731, when a Middlesex team led by Thomas Chambers played against the Duke of Richmond's XI, effectively a Sussex county team, in a match on Richmond Green. It was the return to a match in Chichester a week earlier. In both matches, the stake was 200 guineas. Middlesex won the first match. According to John Major, their patron Chambers was a probable forebear of Lord Frederick Beauclerk.

The second match is notable in one sense as the earliest of which the team scores are known: Richmond's XI 79, Middlesex 119; Richmond's XI 72, and Middlesex 23–5 (approximate). It was agreed beforehand that the match would end promptly at seven o'clock in the evening, and Richmond enforced this agreement even though the match had not started on time because he himself arrived late. The result was therefore a draw – the earliest known use of this term for a result.

The state of play at seven o'clock was that Middlesex needed only "about 8 to 10 notches" with either four or five wickets standing. Gambling was rife in eighteenth century cricket and, a large crowd in attendance, a lot of money was riding on a Middlesex win. There was uproar about the prompt finish making no allowance for the delayed start. When Richmond refused to play on, the crowd rioted and some of the Sussex players "had the shirts ripped off their backs". It was said a lawsuit "will commence about the play". On Wednesday, 8 September, the Daily Post Boy reported that "(on 6 September) 11 of Surrey beat the 11 who about a fortnight ago beat the Duke of Richmond's men". This would suggest that the Duke of Richmond conceded his controversial game against Chambers' Middlesex.

Middlesex at Lord's
Middlesex used Lord's Old Ground when it opened in 1787, with the earliest known match on the ground being between Middlesex  and an Essex XI on 31 May 1787. Noted Middlesex players in the 18th century included William Fennex and Thomas Lord.

The Thursday Club
In May–June 1795, Marylebone Cricket Club (MCC) played five matches at Lord's Old Ground, the first three against a team called "the Thursday Club" and the last two against a team called "Middlesex". Although Arthur Haygarth makes no comment about the members of these two teams, it is evident that several players are common to both as James Rice (5 appearances), William Barton (4), James Beeston (4), John Goldham (4), Thomas Lord (4), Sylvester (4), Charles Warren (4), Harry Bridger (3) and Wheeler (2) all played for both the Thursday and Middlesex teams. N. Graham (2), Thomas Ray (2) and Robert Turner (2) played for Middlesex but not for Thursday; Ray also played once for MCC against Thursday. George Shepheard (3), W. Beeston (2) and Dale (2) played only for Thursday and not for Middlesex. Six others, including Thomas Shackle, played for one of the teams in a single match only.

Details are sketchy but it seems the Marylebone Thursday Club was originally a Thursday Club in the literal sense that was started by amateur cricketers of Middlesex who acquired the services of certain Middlesex professionals, such as Ray and Sylvester who were both employed at Lord's as MCC ground staff players. Team nomenclature changed frequently in Georgian times. Samuel Britcher, who was the MCC scorer calls the team "Thursday Club" in the first three matches of 1795 (as does Haygarth) but then refers to "the County of Middlesex" in both the fourth and fifth games on 25 May and 26 June. Haygarth simply uses "Middlesex" for these two. Britcher refers to the "Middlesex Club" from 1796.

19th century
The present Middlesex County Cricket Club was informally founded on 15 December 1863 at a meeting in the London Tavern with formal constitution taking place on 2 February 1864. The creation of the club was largely through the efforts of the Walker family of Southgate. The county club played its first first-class match against Sussex County Cricket Club at Islington in June 1864. There is an article about early Middlesex cricket in the 14 September 1882 issue of Cricket: A Weekly Record of the Game.

References

Bibliography
 
 
 
 
 
 
 
 

Cricket teams in London
English cricket teams in the 18th century
English cricket in the 19th century
Former senior cricket clubs
History of Middlesex